The Karoo thrush (Turdus smithi), also known as Smith's thrush, is a member of the thrush family in Africa. It has traditionally been considered a subspecies of the olive thrush (with which it is known to hybridize), but is increasingly treated as a separate species. The specific name honours the Scottish military surgeon and zoologist Sir Andrew Smith.

Description
This medium-sized bird has a length of about 24 cm. It has a wing length between 117 and 131 mm, a culmen length between 20 and 24 mm and a tarsus length between 30.0 and 34.5 mm. It can reach a mass of at least 86 g. It differs from the olive thrush by its longer, entirely yellow bill, its longer wings, and its greyer flanks.

Range
It occurs in South Africa, where it is present in Little Namaqualand, the Karoo and Northern Cape, Free State, Gauteng, Limpopo, Mpumalanga and parts of the North West Province.

Gallery

References

External links
 Bo T Bonnevie, The biology of suburban Olive Thrushes (Turdus olivaceus olivaceus) in the Eastern Cape, South Africa (2005). M.Sc. thesis, Rhodes University, South Africa
Olive/Karoo Thrush identification
Birds of Southern Africa - Karoo Thrush

Karoo thrush
Karoo thrush
Endemic birds of South Africa
Karoo
Karoo thrush
Karoo thrush